Hessa bint Trad Al Shaalan is a Saudi royal and the wife of King Abdullah who was the ruler of Saudi Arabia between 2005 and 2015. There are many reports stating that she was his favourite spouse. 

Princess Hessa is the founder and president of the National Home Health Care Foundation. She established the foundation in Riyadh in 1997 to provide care for the patients with terminal illnesses after they are discharged from public hospitals. 

Princess Hessa has eight children with King Abdullah, including Prince Faisal and Princess Abeer. The others include Prince Mansour, Princess Haifa who is the wife of Saud bin Mishaal bin Abdulaziz, Princess Reema, Princess Seeta, Princess Sara who is the wife of Fahd bin Badr bin Abdulaziz and Princess Naifah. As of 2020 Prince Mansour was the chairman of the Knowledge Economic City Company which runs the King Abdullah Economic City.

References

Hessa
Hessa
Saudi Arabian philanthropists
Hessa
Hessa
Princesses by marriage